The Chinhai spiny newt (Echinotriton chinhaiensis) is a species of salamander in the family Salamandridae, found only in a small section of Zhejiang province in eastern China. Its natural habitats are temperate forests, freshwater marshes, and ponds.

The Chinhai spiny newt is unique to the Beilun District east of Ningbo. It is threatened by habitat loss.

Observations of captive animals suggest the Chinhai spiny newt is a late-maturing, long-lived species: they reach sexual maturity at 10 years age or later, and their lifespans are at least 20 years.

References

Rolling animals
Newts
Amphibians described in 1932
Amphibians of China
Endemic fauna of Zhejiang
Taxonomy articles created by Polbot
Critically endangered fauna of China